Sharon Johnston   (born 1943) is a Canadian author who was the 55th viceregal consort of Canada, due to being the wife of David Johnston, the 28th Governor General of Canada.

Life and career
A native of Sault Ste. Marie, she completed her studies in physiotherapy and occupational therapy at the University of Toronto and received a BSc degree at the University of Western Ontario and an MSc degree at McGill University. She also graduated as a Doctor of Philosophy in rehabilitation science at McGill.

The Johnstons married in 1964 and were high school sweethearts.

She began her medical career working for the Crippled Children's Centre in Toronto, now known as the Holland Bloorview Kids Rehabilitation Hospital.

At the time of her husband's appointment as Governor General, she was taking a creative writing course at Humber College and writing a historical fiction novel. The novel, the first volume of a planned trilogy, was published by Dundurn Press as Matrons and Madams in April 2015.

She operates a horse training centre, Chatterbox Farm outside of Waterloo, Ontario, which she owns with her husband. They have five daughters together.

Honours
 As the viceregal consort of Canada, she was styled Her Excellency while in office. She was invested ex officio as a Companion of the Order of Canada (CC) by Queen Elizabeth II on September 5, 2010, during an audience with Her Majesty at Balmoral Castle. She was also appointed as a Dame of Justice of the Most Venerable Order of the Hospital of Saint John of Jerusalem (DStJ) at the same time.
 When she and her husband left office on October 2, 2017, their Order of Canada appointments were transferred to appointments as Extraordinary Companions.
 In 2012, she was awarded the Canadian version of the Queen Elizabeth II Diamond Jubilee Medal.  
 On April 18, 2018, she was given the Key to the City of Ottawa by Mayor of Ottawa Jim Watson.
 On July 29, 2018, she was named an Alpha Gamma Delta Distinguished Citizen, one of their highest alumnae honours.

Ribbon bars of Sharon Johnston

Honorary military appointments
  June 6, 2016present: Honorary Captain of the Royal Canadian Navy, with responsibility for Military Personnel Command of the Canadian Armed Forces.

Honorary educational appointments
Sharon Johnston has been nominated to many voluntary educational roles, such as the board of Collège international Marie de France in Montreal, and Bishop's College School in Lennoxville, Quebec.

Honorary degrees

See also
Viceregal consort of Canada

References

External links
 Sharon Johnston, former Vice-Regal Consort biography

Living people
Canadian viceregal consorts
Bishop's College School Faculty
McGill University alumni
University of Toronto alumni
University of Western Ontario alumni
People from Sault Ste. Marie, Ontario
Canadian physiotherapists
1943 births
21st-century Canadian novelists
Canadian women novelists
21st-century Canadian women writers
Companions of the Order of Canada